The 1937 All-Eastern football team consists of American football players chosen by various selectors as the best players at each position among the Eastern colleges and universities during the 1937 college football season.

All-Eastern selections

Quarterbacks
 Clint Frank, Yale (AP-1, NEA-1 [b], AK, PW [hb])
 Sid Luckman, Columbia (PW)

Halfbacks
 Marshall Goldberg, Pittsburgh (AP-1, NEA-1 [b], AK, PW)
 Sid Luckman, Columbia (AP-1, NEA-1 [b], AK)

Fullbacks
 Bill Osmanski, Holy Cross (AP-1, NEA-1 [b], AK)
 Dave Colwell, Yale (PW)

Ends
 Jerome H. Holland, Cornell (AP-1, AK, PW)
 John Wysocki, Villanova (AP-1, NEA-1)
 Davis, Dartmouth (NEA-1)
 Frank Souchak, Pittsburgh (AK, PW)

Tackles
 Tony Matisi, Pittsburgh (AP-1, NEA-1, AK, PW)
 Al Babartsky, Fordham (AK, PW)
 Ed Franco, Fordham (AP-1, NEA-1, AK [g], PW [g])

Guards
 Albin Lezouski, Pittsburgh (AP-1)
 Gus Zitrides, Dartmouth (AP-1)
 Hooper, Cornell (NEA-1)
 Ray DuBois, Navy (NEA-1)
 Bob McNamara, Penn (AK)
 Johnny Nee, Harvard (PW)

Centers
 Alex Wojciechowicz, Fordham (AP-1, NEA-1, AK, PW)

Key
 AP = Associated Press
 NEA = Newspaper Enterprise Association
 AK = Andrew Kerr
 PW = Pop Warner

See also
 1937 College Football All-America Team

References

All-Eastern
All-Eastern college football teams